Patricio David Gomez Barroche (born 20 March 1981 in Buenos Aires, Argentina) is an Argentine footballer. He currently plays for the Mexican club Celaya of the Liga de Ascenso.

Career in Argentina 
"El Pato" began his career in the Argentine Second Division playing for Defensores de Belgrano in 2001. After a strong presents, He then moved on to play with Club Atlético Platense in 2003. In 2004, he moved on to play with Club Atlético Almirante Brown.

Career in El Salvador 
He arrived to El Salvador in 2005 to play with C.D. Vista Hermosa. He struggled in his first season with the club and was benched for a while. The very next season, he made his presence known in the country after scoring 13 goals in the Apertura 2006 Tournament. He moved on to play with C.D. Luis Ángel Firpo in 2007 becoming one of the biggest changes in the country and becoming champion in his first season with C.D. Luis Ángel Firpo. On July 22, 2010, Barroche signed a one-year contract with Águila.

Naturalization rumors 
Carlos de los Cobos made a statement that Barroche and Alejandro de la Cruz have both caught his attention and want to include them to El Salvador national team. Fans support his idea because of there individual talents and their possibilities to make the national team raise.  Though, they both are not yet sure if they will accept the offer as both players look to receive a house in compensation for their talents.

Titles

References

External links
 El Grafico Profile 

1981 births
Living people
Argentine footballers
Argentine expatriate footballers
Footballers from Buenos Aires
Association football forwards
Defensores de Belgrano footballers
Club Atlético Platense footballers
C.D. Vista Hermosa footballers
C.D. Luis Ángel Firpo footballers
C.S. Herediano footballers
C.D. Águila footballers
Expatriate footballers in Mexico
Expatriate footballers in Costa Rica
Expatriate footballers in El Salvador